"Ballet Dancer" is a song by German synth-pop duo the Twins, released as both a 7" and 12" single from their third studio album, A Wild Romance (1983). The band's best selling single, it peaked at No. 19 in their home country of Germany, and at No. 10 in Switzerland, and No. 3 in Italy.

Track listing
7" single
"Ballet Dancer" – 3:25
"Heaven in Your Smile" – 5:54

12" single
"Ballet Dancer (Long Version)" – 4:50
"Criminal Love (Instrumental)" – 3:50
"Heaven in Your Smile" – 5:54

Chart performance

References

External links
 

1984 singles
1983 songs